Garcinia gummi-gutta is a tropical species of Garcinia native to South Asia and Southeast Asia. Common names include Garcinia cambogia (a former scientific name), as well as brindle berry, and Malabar tamarind. The fruit looks like a small pumpkin and is green to pale yellow in color.

Although it has received considerable media attention purporting its effects on weight loss, there are reports of liver toxicity associated with the Hydroxycut commercial preparation containing the fruit extract, with clinical evidence indicating it has no significant effect on weight loss.

Cultivation

Garcinia gummi-gutta is grown for its fruit in Southeast Asia and South Asia. Garcinia gummi-gutta is one of several closely related Garcinia species from the plant family Clusiaceae. With thin skin and deep vertical lobes, the fruit of G. gummi-gutta and related species range from about the size of an orange to that of a grapefruit; G. gummi-gutta looks more like a small yellowish, greenish, or sometimes reddish pumpkin. The color can vary considerably. When the rinds are dried and cured in preparation for storage and extraction, they are dark brown or black in color.

Phytochemicals
Although few high-quality studies have been done to define the composition of the fruit, its phytochemical content includes hydroxycitric acid which is extractable and developed as a dietary supplement. Other compounds identified in the fruit include the polyphenols, luteolin, and kaempferol.

Common names
In the Malabar Coast, it is known as kudam puli and in Tamil speaking areas of Sri Lanka and India, it is called goraka.

Weight loss claims
In late 2012, a United States celebrity doctor, Dr. Oz, promoted Garcinia cambogia extract as "an exciting breakthrough in natural weight loss". Dr. Oz's endorsements of dietary supplements having no or little scientific evidence of efficacy have often led to a substantial increase in consumer purchases of the promoted products.

While it has received considerable media attention purporting impact on weight loss, the evidence for Garcinia cambogia supports no clear effect, while gastrointestinal adverse events were two-fold more common over the placebo in a 2011 meta-analysis, indicating the extract may be unsafe for human consumption. Adverse events associated with use of such supplements ("side effects") — especially, liver toxicity, as well as gastrointestinal issues — led to one preparation being withdrawn from the market.

Adverse effects
In addition to possible liver damage, hydroxycitric acid can cause dry mouth, nausea, gastrointestinal discomfort, and headaches.

Drug interactions
There is potential for Garcinia cambogia to interfere with prescription medications, including those used to treat people with diabetes, asthma, and clotting disorders.

Culinary

Garcinia gummi-gutta is used in cooking, including in the preparation of curries to add a sour flavor. The fruit rind and extracts of Garcinia species are used in many traditional recipes used in food preparation in Southeast Asian countries. In the Indian Ayurvedic medicine, "sour" flavors are said to activate digestion. The extract and rind of G. gummi-gutta is a curry condiment in India. It is an essential souring ingredient in the southern Thai variant of kaeng som, a sour curry.

Gallery

See also
Garcinia binucao
Garcinia dulcis
Garcinia morella

References

gummi-gutta
Medicinal plants of Africa
Medicinal plants of Asia
Indian spices
Spices
Plants described in 1814